River Horse Brewing Co. is a craft brewery in Ewing Township in Mercer County, New Jersey. It was started in 1996 but then came under new ownership in 2007. It is NJ's second largest craft brewery, after Flying Fish Brewery.

History
River Horse Brewing Co. was founded by the Bryan brother, Jim, Jack, and Tim. The original location was in Lambertville, New Jersey in the 10,000 sq ft OTC Cracker Factory. After 11 years, the brother sold the brewery to Glenn Bernabeo and Chris Walsh, who just sold their private equity firm SSG Capital Advisors and were looking for "Another Challenge". In 2013 they moved the brewery to a new 25,000 sq ft facility in Ewing, NJ.

Products
River Horse's main beer styles are: "Hippotizing IPA" an American IPA, "Tripel Horse" a Belgian-style Tripel Ale, "Roly Poly Pils" a Czech Style Pilsner, "My Name Is Citrus Maximus" a fruited IPA, River Horse IPA, and "Special Ale" an American Amber Ale. They also produce a variety of seasonal ales, such as a summer blonde ale and autumn pumpkin ale.

Awards and recognition
In 2017, River Horse's Triple Horse won third place in the GABF.

See also
Alcohol laws of New Jersey
Beer in New Jersey
Beer in the United States
List of wineries, breweries, and distilleries in New Jersey

References

External links

Beer brewing companies based in New Jersey
Tourist attractions in Mercer County, New Jersey
1996 establishments in New Jersey
Ewing Township, New Jersey